The historic Capitol Theatre was built at 50 West 200 South in downtown Salt Lake City during 1913. Originally operated as a vaudeville house named Orpheum Theater, this was soon renamed Capitol Theater during 1927. And is currently also known as the JQ Lawson Capitol Theater. The building style is Italian Renaissance. 

The county maintains partnerships with Utah-based Ballet West, Utah Opera, and the Children’s Dance Theater (Tanner Dance at the University of Utah), all of which perform regularly at Capitol Theater.  Additional Productions: multiple musicals produced by the Broadway Across America touring company; the White Oak Dance Project in 1993 produced by Mikhail Baryshnikov and Mark Morris (choreographer); and various other plays and performances.  

During the 2002 Winter Olympics, the theatre was used as part of the accompanying Arts Festival with various performances taking place on the stage. 

After the Eccles Theater was built and opened in 2016 just around the corner on Main Street in Salt Lake City, some productions moved from the Capitol Theater to take advantage of the larger stage and more modern sound system of Eccles Theater.  

Capitol Theater is managed by the Salt Lake County Center for the Arts.

Renovations 
The Capitol Theater has undergone various renovations over the course of its history. 

Damaged by a fire during 1949, there was not a major renovation until finally during 1975, funded through an $8.6 million county bond. Extensive renovations were made to the building and auditorium, making it one of the premier performing arts centers in downtown Salt Lake City.

In 2013, the Theater began a major renovation, budgeting $32 million for renovations to the building and adding the Jessie Eccles Quinney Ballet Centre next to the Capitol Theater, expanding lobby space, as well as constructing new rehearsal space, costume space, and administrative offices for the Salt Lake City-based Ballet West dance company. 

In 2019, the theater auditorium began a six-month renovation removing all the seats on the floor of the main auditorium and replacing the floor and adding seats that accommodate ADA seating, replace narrower seats. As well, the plans include adding a new sound system, replacing building infrastructure, and restoring the roof to the original terra cotta façade. This renovation was a second phase of planned work in 2013, when the orchestra pit, backstage/downstairs, and the stage itself were improved.

References

External links 

https://artsaltlake.org/

Buildings and structures in Salt Lake City
Buildings and structures completed in 1913
Theatres in Utah
Music venues in Utah
Performing arts centers in Utah